The manicule, is a typographic mark with the appearance of a hand with its index finger extending in a pointing gesture. Originally used for handwritten marginal notes, it later came to be used in printed works to draw the reader's attention to important text. Though once widespread, it is rarely used today, except as an occasional archaic novelty.

Terminology
For most of its history, the mark has been inconsistently referred to by a variety of names. William H. Sherman, in the first dedicated study of the mark, uses the term manicule (from the Latin root manicula, meaning "little hand"), but also identifies 15 further names which have been used:

 hand
 pointing hand
 hand director
 pointer
 digit
 fist
 mutton fist
 bishop's fist
 index
 
 indicator
 indicule
 maniple
 pilcrow

The last three Sherman labels erroneous, with indicule and maniple being mishearings or conflations, and pilcrow properly referring to the paragraph mark, .

History

Handwritten manicules

The symbol originates in scribal tradition of the medieval and Renaissance period, appearing in the margin of manuscripts to mark corrections or notes. The earliest book known to include manicules is the 1086 Domesday Book, where they are used for marginal annotations alongside other marks such as daggers. The age of the annotations is not known, and they may date to later than the 11th century.
 
Manicules are first known to appear in the 12th century in handwritten manuscripts in Spain, and became common in the 14th and 15th centuries in Italy with some very elaborate with shading and artful cuffs. Some were playful and elaborate, but others were as simple as "two squiggly strokes suggesting the barest sketch of a pointing hand" and thus quick to draw.

After the popularization of the printing press starting in the 1450s, the handwritten version continued in handwritten form as a means to annotate printed documents, eventually falling out of popularity by the nineteenth century.

In print

Early printers using a type representing the manicule included 
Mathias Huss and Johannes Schabeler in Lyons in their 1484  edition of Paulus Florentinus'  Breviarum totius juris canonici. Writer John Boardley identifies the first appearance of a manicule in a printed book as an earlier 1479 edition of the same work, Breviarum totius juris canonici, printed in Milan by Leonhard Pachel and Ulrich Scinzenzeller.

In contrast with their handwritten use, early printed manicules appeared in the main text, pointing outward toward corresponding printed margin notes. Later, beginning in the sixteenth century, the manicule came to be used as a decorative element on the title pages of books, alongside other so-called "dingbats" such as the fleuron.

The manicule attained a great degree of popularity in the nineteenth century, particularly in advertisements. At this time, they also became more visually diverse, with larger and more complex fists being created. They were also widely used in signage, with some fingerposts having relief-printed or even fully three-dimensional physical manifestations of pointing hands. The United States Postal Service has also used a pointing hand as a graphical indicator for its "Return to Sender" stamp.

Its popularity declined toward the end of the nineteenth century, perhaps due to its oversaturation in advertising. By the 1890s, it was rarely used unless for ironic effect. Sherman (2005) argues that as the symbols became standardized, they were no longer reflective of individuality in comparison to other writing, and this explains their diminished popularity.

Usage examples

The typical use of the pointing hand is as a bullet-like symbol to direct the reader's attention to important text, having roughly the same meaning as the word "attention" or "note".  It is used this way both by annotators and printers.  Even in the first few centuries of use, it can be seen used to draw attention to specific text, such as a title (in some cases in the form of a row of manicules), inserted text, noteworthy passage, or sententiae.  In some cases, flower marks and asterisks were used for similar purposes. Less commonly, in earlier centuries the pointing hand acted as a section divider with a pilcrow as paragraph divider; or more rarely as the paragraph divider itself.

Some encyclopedias use it in articles to cross-reference, as in ☞ other articles.  
It occasionally sees use in magazines and comic books to indicate to the reader that a story on the right-hand page continues onto the next.

In modern printing, it was used as a standard typographical symbol marking notes. The  American Dictionary of Printing and Bookmaking (1894) treats it as the seventh in the standard sequence of footnote markers, following the paragraph sign (pilcrow).

In linguistics, the symbol is used in optimality theory tableaux to identify the optimal output in a candidate of generated possibilities from a given input.

American science fiction writer Kurt Vonnegut used the symbol as a form of margin on the first line of every paragraph in his novel Breakfast of Champions. The literary effect of this was to create separation between each paragraph, reinforcing the stream of consciousness style of the text.

American essayist and cultural critic H.L. Mencken, often credited with having first coined the aphorism, "When you point one finger, there are three fingers pointing back to you," is also reported to have used this symbol to convey this sentiment in shorthand, seen first in his telegrams as early as the 1920s. 

Thomas Pynchon parodies this punctuation mark in his novel Gravity's Rainbow by depicting a middle finger, rather than an index finger, pointing at a line of text.

Computer cursor
An upward pointing hand is often used in the mouse cursor in graphical user interfaces (such as those in Adobe Acrobat and Photoshop) to indicate an object that can be manipulated.  
The first is believed to be the Xerox Star. Many web browsers use an upward pointing hand cursor to indicate a clickable hyperlink. CSS 2.0 allows the "cursor" property to be set to "hand" or "pointer" to intentionally change the mouse cursor to this symbol when hovering over an object; "move" may produce a closed fisted hand.  
Many video games made in the 1980s and '90s, primarily text-based adventure games, also used these cursors.

Unicode
Unicode (version 1.0, 1991) introduced six "pointing index" characters in the Miscellaneous Symbols block:

 (☝︎ in non-emoji form using Variant Selector 15)

Unicode 6.0 (2010) included several emoji pointing hands:

Unicode 7.0 (2014) incorporated several more indices, sourced from the Wingdings 2 font:

Unicode 13.0 (2020) added a three-part index (🯁🯂🯃), for compatibility with legacy computing character sets:

See also
 V sign
 Obelus (historic text pointer)

References

Sources 

  
 
  (also )

External links

Collection of photographs of manicules on Flickr

Palaeography
Typographical symbols